George Taylor (born 23 January 1901) was an English footballer who played in the Football League for Newport County and Oldham Athletic.

References

1901 births
Year of death missing
English footballers

Association football forwards
English Football League players
Ashton United F.C. players
Oldham Athletic A.F.C. players
Macclesfield Town F.C. players
Newport County A.F.C. players